is a district located in Fukuoka Prefecture, Japan.

As of 2003, the district has an estimated population of 50,658 and a density of 255.01 persons per km2. The total area is 198.65 km2. Water wheels form one of the attractions of the district.

Towns and villages 
Chikuzen
Tōhō

Mergers 
On March 22, 2005 the former towns of Miwa and Yasu merged, becoming the town of Chikuzen.
On March 28, 2005 the former villages of Hōshuyama and Koishiwara merged, becoming the village of Tōhō.
On March 20, 2006 the former towns of Asakura and Haki merged with the city of Amagi to form the new city of Asakura.

Districts in Fukuoka Prefecture